Crew Dragon Endurance (Dragon C210) is a Crew Dragon spacecraft manufactured by SpaceX, built and operated under NASA's Commercial Crew Program. On 11 November 2021, it was launched to transport personnel to the International Space Station as part of the SpaceX Crew-3 mission, which became a part of ISS Expedition 66.

History
On 7 October 2021, it was announced that Dragon C210 will be called Endurance. Astronaut Raja Chari said that the name honors the SpaceX and NASA teams that built the spacecraft and trained the astronauts who will fly it. Those workers endured through a pandemic. The name also honors Endurance, the ship used by Shackleton's Imperial Trans-Antarctic Expedition. The three-masted vessel sank in 1915 after being bound in ice before reaching Antarctica and was found during the Crew-3 mission.

Endurance was first launched on 11 November 2021 (UTC) on a Falcon 9 Block 5 from the Kennedy Space Center (KSC), LC-39A, carrying NASA astronauts Raja Chari, Thomas Marshburn, and Kayla Barron, as well as ESA astronaut Matthias Maurer on a six-month mission to the International Space Station.

Flights

Gallery

References

External links 
 

SpaceX Dragon 2
Individual space vehicles
NASA spacecraft
Crewed spacecraft